Hallee Leah Hirsh (born 1987/1988) is an American actress perhaps best known for her roles as Mattie Grace Johnson on JAG, Daley in the children's series Flight 29 Down, and as the adolescent and young adult Rachel Greene on ER.

Early life
Hallee was born on Offutt Air Force Base in Omaha, Nebraska, the daughter of Deborah, a naval officer, and Mike Hirsh, a Marine officer. She began acting when she was three, with her older brother Greg.

Hirsch and her family moved frequently, first to Pensacola, Florida, where Hallee landed her first role after her first audition in Orlando for Disney's Big Red Boat cruise line. When she was four, her mother was transferred to Long Island, and Hallee began taking the train into Manhattan after school to audition almost daily, landing roles such as Annabel Fox in You've Got Mail.

After her agent, Abby Bluestone, moved to Los Angeles, Hallee at age 11 and her family followed, and her mother was stationed in Monterey, California. Hallee lived with her father in the Oakwood Toluca Hills apartment complex, alongside other notable child stars such as Hilary Duff, a time which she has referred to as "an important part of her life". She graduated magna cum laude from UCLA in 2011, majoring in anthropology and minoring in Chinese.

Career
Hirsh first portrayed Rachel Greene in the eighth season (2001-02) of ER in a storyline where a now teenage and rebellious Rachel leaves her mother in St. Louis to be with her father, Mark Greene; the character returns to St. Louis when Mark dies that season. Hirsh later reprised her role in 2004 in the season 10 episode "Midnight", visiting her stepmother Dr. Elizabeth Corday. In the ER series finale, aired April 2, 2009, titled "And in the End", Hirsh's character returned as a candidate interviewing for medical school, bringing the Greene family history full circle.

Following her one main season on ER, Hirsh appeared in the recurring role of Matilda "Mattie" Grace Johnson, for 17 episodes (2003-05) on the television series JAG. Hirsh next starred in the Discovery Kids Channel teen series, Flight 29 Down.

Hirsh is the recipient of two Youth in Film Young Artist Awards and was nominated for best acting awards for four other roles. She was nominated for Best Comedic Actress in a Feature Film at the 2009 Method Fest film festival for her work in 16 to Life and won Best Actress for same role and film at both the 2010 Tunis International Film Festival and the 2010 Alaska International Film Festival.

Hirsh has not been active in film or television since 2014, with one subsequent credit in the film Chasing The Rain in 2020.

Personal life
Hirsh married Ryan Martin in 2013 and they have two sons, born in May 2014 and December 2018. At the end of 2014, the family relocated from Los Angeles to Asheville, North Carolina, where they operate Hole Doughnuts,  a doughnut shop which received recognition from Bon Appétit magazine for "Dessert of the Year" in 2016.

Filmography

Film

Television

References

External links

 
 
 High As Earth 

Actresses from Omaha, Nebraska
American child actresses
American film actresses
American television actresses
Living people
20th-century American actresses
21st-century American actresses
Year of birth missing (living people)